James Russell "Rusty" Page  (10 May 1908 – 22 May 1985) was a New Zealand army officer, and rugby union player and administrator.

Early life and family
Born in Dunedin in 1908, Page was the son of John and Helen Stuart Page (née Caradus). From 1922 to 1926 he was educated at Southland Boys' High School, where he was junior athletics, shooting and tennis champion in 1922. In 1926 he was captain of the school's 1st XV rugby team, head prefect and senior athletics champion. The recipient of a New Zealand military scholarship, Page undertook army officer training at the Royal Military College, Sandhurst from 1927 to 1928. His engagement to Betty Penston Blundell was announced in May 1936, and the couple married at West Wickham in south-west London in July that year.

Rugby union
Primarily a first five-eighth, Page played for London Scottish while at Sandhurst. He was a reserve for Scotland in one match, but did not take the field. Returning to New Zealand in 1930, Page represented Wellington at a provincial level, and was a member of the New Zealand national side, the All Blacks, from 1931 to 1935. He played 18 matches for the All Blacks—three of which were as captain—including six internationals.

He later served on the executives of the Wellington Rugby Football Union (WRFU) from 1947 to 1949 and the New Zealand Rugby Union from 1953 to 1954. He was also president of the WRFU in 1967.

Military career
Page was commissioned as a second lieutenant in the New Zealand Staff Corps in August 1928. He served as adjutant at Fort Dorset on the Miramar Peninsula in 1935, and with the Royal New Zealand Artillery, and, as a lieutenant colonel, following the outbreak of World War II was appointed commanding officer of 26 (NZ) Battalion when it was formed in May 1940. He saw active service with the Battalion in Greece and North Africa. He was wounded on 27 November 1941 at Sidi Rezegh during Operation Crusader and was invalided back to New Zealand.

In recognition of his gallant and distinguished service in the Middle East, and in particular in November 1941 at Sidi Rezegh where he was wounded, Page was appointed a Companion of the Distinguished Service Order in March 1942. His investiture by the Governor-General, Lord Newall, took place at a ceremony at Wellington Town Hall on 2 August 1944. Part of his citation read:

For the remainder of the war, Page held various posts in New Zealand, including inspector of training from August 1942. From January 1943 he was stationed at Army Headquarters in Wellington. He was later commandant of the New Zealand Northern Military District from 1950 to 1952, when he was appointed adjutant-general at Army Headquarters.

In 1953, Page was awarded the Queen Elizabeth II Coronation Medal, and he was appointed a Commander of the Military Division of the Order of the British Empire in the 1954 New Year Honours.

Page was appointed quartermaster-general in 1956 and New Zealand joint services liaison in Canberra in 1960. He retired from the army with the rank of brigadier in 1963. He died in Auckland in 1985 at the age of 77.

References

External links
Generals of World War II

1908 births
1985 deaths
New Zealand military personnel
Rugby union players from Dunedin
People educated at Southland Boys' High School
Graduates of the Royal Military College, Sandhurst
New Zealand rugby union players
New Zealand international rugby union players
Wellington rugby union players
Rugby union fly-halves
Rugby union centres
London Scottish F.C. players
New Zealand military personnel of World War II
New Zealand brigadiers
New Zealand Commanders of the Order of the British Empire
New Zealand Companions of the Distinguished Service Order
New Zealand Rugby Football Union officials